Events in the year 2023 in Myanmar.

Incumbents

Events 

 7 January - One person is killed and 60 others are injured in a prison riot in Pathein.
 1 February - On the second anniversary of the 2021 military coup d'état, the military extends the country's state of emergency for another six months, postponing the general election initially scheduled for August 1. The opposition marks the occasion with a silent strike.

Holidays
 4 January -Independence Day

References 

 
2010s in Myanmar
Years of the 21st century in Myanmar
Myanmar
Myanmar